is a Japanese science fiction writer. Among other works, he has written Triceratops (トリケラトプス), which has been collected in The World Treasury of Science Fiction edited by David G. Hartwell.

Works
1964 Black Sun. (Kuroi taiyô) (Story for film.)
1989 Triceratops. (The Best Japanese Science Fiction Stories, Dembner Books, 1989 / Barricade Books, 1997)
Hikari (Speculative Japan, Kurodahan Press, 2007)

References

External links
 

Japanese writers
Japanese crime fiction writers
Mystery Writers of Japan Award winners
1935 births
2012 deaths